Ezra (Hebrew: עֶזְרָא) is a masculine given name of Hebrew origin, derived from the root ע-ז-ר meaning "help".

The name originated from the Biblical figure Ezra the Scribe, who is traditionally credited as the author of Ezra-Nehemiah and the Books of Chronicles of the Hebrew Bible. The name is a probable abbreviation of the name Azaryahu (עזריהו) which means "Yahweh helps". The name alternatively has the Greek-Latin form Esdras which was used for  Ezra the Scribe which comes from the Greek word (Ἔσδρας). The name grew in popularity in the United States between 2000 and 2018, its ranking climbing from 431st to 59th.

Given name
Ezra Abbot (1819–1884), American biblical scholar
Ezra Ames (1768–1836), American portrait painter
Ezra Attiya (1885–1970), Rosh yeshiva, Porat Yosef Yeshiva, Jerusalem
Ezra Baker (born c. 1765), American politician
Ezra Bartlett (1861–1942), English cricketer
Ezra T. Benson (1811–1869), American religious leader
Ezra Taft Benson (1899–1994), American politician and religious leader
Charles Ezra Beury (1879–1953), American academic administrator
Ezra Booth (1792–1873), American religious leader
Ezra Brainerd (1844–1924), American academic administrator
Ezra A. Burrell (1867–?), American politician
Ezra Butler (1763–1838), American politician
Ezra Butler (American football) (born 1984), American footballer born in South Africa
Ezra C. Carleton (1838–1911), American politician
Ezra A. Carman (1834–1909), American military officer
Ezra Chitando, Zimbabwean academic
Ezra Churchill (1806–1874), Canadian industrialist
Ezra Clark, Jr. (1813–1896), American politician
Ezra Cleveland (born 1998), American football player
Ezra Cline (1907–1984), American bluegrass bassist
Ezra Danolds Cole (1902–1992), American philatelist
Ezra Convis (died 1838), American politician
Ezra Cornell (1807–1874), American businessman, co-founder of Cornell University
Ezra C. Dalby (1869–1934), American academic administrator
Ezra Darby (1768–1808), American politician
Ezra Dean (1795–1872), American politician
Ezra Butler Eddy (1827–1906), Canadian businessman and political figure
Ezra Fitch (1865–1930), American businessman, co-founder of Abercrombie & Fitch
Ezra Bartlett French (1810–1880), American politician
Ezra Furman (born 1986), American musician and songwriter
Ezra C. Gross (1787–1829), American politician
Ezra Heywood (1829–1893), American anarchist
Ezra Johnson (born 1955), American football player 
Ezra Jack Keats (1916–1983), American author
Ezra Kendall (1861–1910), American actor-comedian, humorist, playwright and author
Ezra Otis Kendall (1818–1899), American professor, astronomer and mathematician
Ezra Kire (born 1975), American musician
Ezra Klein (born 1984), American blogger and journalist
Ezra Koenig (born 1984), American musician
Ezra Levant (born 1972), Canadian writer
Ezra Meeker (1830–1928), American pioneer
Ezra Miller (born 1992), American actor
Ezra Nawi (born 1952), Israeli peace activist
Ezra T. Newman (1929–2021), American physicist, known for his many contributions to general relativity theory
Ezra Pound (1885–1972), American poet
Ezra Schochet, rosh yeshiva, Yeshiva Ohr Elchonon Chabad/West Coast Talmudical Seminary, Los Angeles
Ezra Solomon (1920–2002), American economist
Ezra Stiles (1727–1795), American educator, president of Yale University
Ezra C. Stiles (1891–1974), American landscape architect
Ezra Clark Stillman (1907–1995), American linguist
Ezra Stoller (1915–2004), American photographer
Ezra Stone (1917–1994), American actor
Ezra Sutton (1849–1907), American baseball player
Ezra B. Taylor (1823–1912), American politician
Ezra Vogel (born 1930), American scholar of East Asia
Ezra Weisz (born 1971), American voice actor

Surname
Daniel Ezra (born 1991), British actor
David Ezra (born 1947), American judge
Edward Isaac Ezra (1883–1921), Shanghai hotelier
Gideon Ezra (1937–2012), Israeli politician
Hen Ezra (born 1989), Israeli footballer
Michael Ezra (born 1973), Ugandan philanthropist
N.E.B. Ezra (1883–1936), founder of the Shanghai Zionist Association and Israel's Messenger
Members of the ibn Ezra family of Spanish Jews

References 

Jewish given names
Modern names of Hebrew origin
Masculine given names
English masculine given names